The Malaysian Indian Congress (MIC; ; formerly known as Malayan Indian Congress) is a Malaysian political party. It is one of the founding members of the coalition Barisan Nasional, previously known as the Alliance, which was in power from when the country achieved independence in 1957 until the elections in 2018. The party was among the first to fight for Malayan Independence and is one of the oldest parties in Malaysia.

The MIC was established in August 1946 to advocate for Indian independence from British colonial rule. After India gained its independence, MIC turned its focus to the struggle for the independence of Malaya (now Malaysia), which was achieved in 1957. It positioned itself to represent the Indian community in Malaya in the post-World War II development of the country. The MIC, the United Malays National Organisation and the Malaysian Chinese Association formed the National Alliance in 1954. The National Alliance incorporated additional parties and became the Barisan Nasional in 1973.

The MIC was once the largest party representing the Indian community, but has performed poorly in elections since 2008, losing out to Pakatan Harapan, which also represents majority of the Indian community.

History

John Thivy and Indian nationalism
John Thivy, the founder of the MIC, met Mahatma Gandhi at London while studying law. He was inspired by Gandhi's ideology and Nehru's vision and became determined to fight for Indian independence. He became actively involved in the Indian nationalist movement and returned to Malaya. He founded the Malaya Indian Congress (renamed Malaysian Indian Congress after the formation of the Federation of Malaysia in 1963) in August 1946, and was party president until 1947. The word 'Congress' in the party's name refers to the Indian National Congress, the party Mahatma Gandhi led to fight for Indian independence.

Baba Budh Singh Ji, Ramanathan, and opposition to the Malayan Union 
After India gained independence in 1947, the MIC changed its focus and started to fight for the independence of Malaya. Baba Budh Singh Ji became president of MIC in 1947. After World War II, the British had established the Malayan Union, unifying the Malay Peninsula under a single government to simplify administration. Although a majority of the Indian community supported the Malayan Union, the MIC did not. The Malayan Union was dissolved in 1948 after widespread Malay protests and replaced with the Federation of Malaya. The MIC later joined the All-Malaya Council of Joint Action under Tun Tan Cheng Lock in opposition to the Federation of Malaya Agreement.

K. Ramanathan became president in 1950. By this time, the MIC was the leading party representing Indians in Malaya. Ramanathan advocated for the relaxation of the language proficiency test as a prerequisite for citizenship for Indians, and urged Indians to obtain federal citizenship.

K.L. Devaser and a focus on Malayan independence
The MIC's fourth President, Kundan Lal Devaser, served from 1951 to 1955. It was during his period that MIC started to focus on the fight for Malayan independence.

Under Devaser, the MIC contested the 1952 Kuala Lumpur Municipal Elections in alliance with the Independence of Malaya Party, Dato' Onn bin Jaafar and other non-communal organisations. The election ended with a failure for MIC as their coalition was defeated by the Alliance Party. The defeat showed MIC that it stood a better chance of gaining influence by joining the Alliance. In 1954 the MIC joined the United Malays National Organisation and the Malayan Chinese Association in the Alliance, securing a place for Indians in the administration. The party's broader membership was less enthusiastic than the MIC leadership about joining the Alliance but were willing to support the move if the party could secure concessions from the Alliance on inter-communal issues, particularly on education.

Devaser was primarily popular among the urban-based Indian elite, and lacked wider grassroots support. For the first eight years,  MIC leaders were either of North Indian or Malayalee origin, a minority among Malayan Indians. The majority of Indians in Malaya at that time were Tamils, most of whom were labourers in plantations. Indian plantation workers experienced enforced segregation because of plantation compound housing. The plantation labour system also worked against the integration of Indian workers into society and perpetuated racial and occupational differentiation. Plantation workers were unable to acquire the skills required to move to better-paying jobs.

Migrant plantation workers were both marginalised and polarised in Malaya. Their wages were tied to rubber prices, falling when the rubber price fell, and were about 50c per day. Devaser came under heavy criticism from the Tamil media for not addressing the pressing issues facing the community. Some in the party felt that there was a need for a leader with a stronger relationship with the party's grassroots. In March 1955, the local daily Tamil Murasu urged Tamils to boycott the MIC. This was followed by a call for change in MIC's leadership, led by Tamil MIC leaders, and Devaser stepped down. The MIC then faced the challenge of reconciling the political aspirations of the middle class with the needs of the working class, who at the time comprised 84% of the plantation workforce.

V. T Sambanthan and becoming a Tamil party
In May 1955, Tun V. T. Sambanthan was elected as the fifth President of the Malayan Indian Congress. Sambanthan started a recruitment campaign among plantation workers, relying on the patronage of Hinduism in its popular South Indian form, increased use of the Tamil language, and encouraging Tamil cultural activities. He personally toured plantations and encouraged Tamils to join the MIC. This led to a fragmentation of the Indian community, with traditionalists and the lower middle class becoming prominent in the party while upper-class professionals and the intelligentsia moved away from it. Two paths to leadership emerged in the Indian community, via politics or via trade union activism, with very little interaction between them.

Under Sambanthan's leadership, the MIC effectively became a Tamil party. Sambanthan served as president of the MIC until 1971 and was largely responsible for the transformation of the party to a conservative and traditionalist party emphasising Indian culture, religion and language. It was the weakest of the three main political parties, with the smallest electorate (7.4% in 1959) and had little support from the Indian community at large.

The Indian community was geographically dispersed and divided and comprised less than 25% of the population in any constituency. The MIC's overriding concern was therefore to remain a partner in the Alliance and obtain whatever concessions it could from the dominant UMNO. This led the MIC to compromise on priorities such as the political and economic rights of workers.

Sambanthan sold approximately half of his father's 2.4 km2 rubber estate and donated part of the money to the MIC.  He was not uniformly popular but was able to gradually unite a party that had significant internal divides.  During his presidency, in 1957, Malaysian independence was achieved. Sambanathan was involved in the negotiations with the British government's Reid Commission to draw up the new Malayan constitution. In 1963 Singapore, Sabah and Sarawak merged with the Federation of Malaya to form the Federation of Malaysia, and the MIC renamed itself the Malaysian Indian Congress.

Sambanathan was forced to retire in favour of V. Manickavasagam in 1973 after a rebellion by five MIC leaders including Samy Vellu.

Manickavasagam and non-political ventures
Manickavasagam served as president of MIC from 1973 to 1978. During this period, Malaysia's New Economic Policy was being developed, and the MIC convened two economic conferences in an unsuccessful effort to advocate for the interests of Indians.

It was during this period that the MIC, as member of the Alliance, became part of the Barisan Nasional. The party sponsored the Nesa Multipurpose Cooperative and the MIC Unit Trust as part of its programme for economic ventures. It also set up the MIC Education Fund for members' children and the Malaysian Indian Scholarship Fund for higher education as well as acquiring an Institute for training Indians in technical and trade skills.

Manickavasagam appointed several new representatives to leadership positions, including Subramaniam Sathasivam, Datuk K. Pathmanaban, a Harvard MBA holder, and several others. They were young, well-educated and ambitious but lacked grassroots experience. Subramaniam was hand-picked by Manickavasagam to become deputy president and succeed him, but the party elected Samy Vellu as Deputy President instead, by a narrow margin of 26 votes.

Samy Vellu and emphasis on education
Samy Vellu became MIC president in 1979 and served until 2010. Under his leadership, in 1984, the MIC founded the Maju Institute of Education Development (MIED) to offer educational opportunities and financial support to Indian students in Malaysia. Since its establishment, more than 10,000 students have obtained loans and scholarships totaling about RM60 million MIED fund as of 2013. In 2001, the MIC and MIED launched an AIMST University with the stated goal of helping Indians acquire professional training. Vellu was the founding chancellor of the university. By 2018, the university had achieved a score of 4 on the Malaysian Higher Education Institution's 5-point rating scale. However, AIMST's commitment to training Indian students has been questioned.

Vellu was succeeded by G. Palanivel who served from 2010 to 2014.  Subramaniam was then elected, initially in an acting role, serving from 2014 to 2018. , the party is led by Vigneswaran Sanasee.

Central Working Committee 

 President: Vigneswaran Sanasee
 Deputy President: Saravanan Murugan
 1st Vice-President: T. Mohan
 2nd Vice-President: T. Murugiah
 3rd Vice-President: M. Asojan
 4th Vice-President: Vell Paari 
 5th Vice-President: Kohilan Pillay Appu
 Secretary-General: R. T. Rajasekaran
 Treasurer-General: Tan Sri Ramasamy 
 Information Chief: R.Thinalan

 Executive Secretary: R. Gunaseelan
 Youth Leader: Raven Kumar Krishnasamy
 Deputy Youth Leader: Andrew David
 Women Leader: Mohana Muniandy Raman
 Deputy Women Leader:  Vickneswary Babuji
 Putera Leader: Dr. A. Kishva
 Deputy Putera Leader: Dr. Shatesh Kumar Sangar
 Puteri Leader: R. Shaliny
 Deputy Puteri Leader: S. Teeba

44 Central Working Committee Members:

Source:

List of party leaders

Presidents of the Malayan Indian Congress (1946–1963)

Presidents of the Malaysian Indian Congress (1963–present)

Elected representatives

Dewan Negara (Senate)

Senators 

 S Vell Paari – appointed by the Yang di-Pertuan Agong
 Nelson Renganathan – appointed by the Yang di-Pertuan Agong
 Sivarraajh Chandran – appointed by the Yang di-Pertuan Agong

Dewan Rakyat (House of Representatives)

Members of Parliament of the 15th Malaysian Parliament 

, MIC has only 1 MP in the House of Representatives.

Dewan Undangan Negeri (State Legislative Assembly)

Malaysian State Assembly Representatives 

Johor State Legislative Assembly
Malacca State Legislative Assembly
Negeri Sembilan State Legislative Assembly
Perlis State Legislative Assembly

Kedah State Legislative Assembly
Kelantan State Legislative Assembly
Terengganu State Legislative Assembly

Penang State Legislative Assembly
Perak State Legislative Assembly
Pahang State Legislative Assembly

Selangor State Legislative Assembly
Sabah State Legislative Assembly
Sarawak State Legislative Assembly

General election results

State election results

See also 
 Politics of Malaysia
 List of political parties in Malaysia

References 

 Goh, Cheng Teik (1994). Malaysia: Beyond Communal Politics. Pelanduk Publications. .
 Pillai, M.G.G. (3 November 2005). "National Front parties were not formed to fight for Malaysian independence". Malaysia Today.
 The Star (2 August 2006): "Education a Key MIC Thrust"; M. Krishnamoorthy

External links 

 

1946 establishments in British Malaya
Defunct political parties in Singapore
Political parties in Malaysia
Identity politics
Indian-Malaysian culture
Political parties established in 1946
Political parties of minorities
Indian National Congress breakaway groups
Dravidian political parties